William Dawnay may refer to:
 William Dawnay, 7th Viscount Downe, British politician
 William Dawnay, 6th Viscount Downe, English clergyman and Irish peer